This is a list of characters appearing in The Sandman comic book, published by DC Comics' Vertigo imprint. This page discusses not only events which occur in The Sandman (1989–1994), but also some occurring in spinoffs of The Sandman, such as The Dreaming (1996–2001) and Lucifer (1999–2007), as well as characters from earlier stories which The Sandman was based on. These stories occur in the DC Universe, but are generally tangential to the mainstream DC stories.

The Endless

The Endless are a family of seven anthropomorphic personifications of universal concepts, around whom much of the series revolves. From eldest to youngest, they are:
 Destiny
 Death
 Dream (formerly Morpheus, succeeded by Daniel)
 Destruction ("The Prodigal")
 Desire
 Despair
 Delirium (formerly "Delight")
All debuted in the Sandman series, except Destiny, who was created by Marv Wolfman and Berni Wrightson in Weird Mystery Tales #1 (1972). Constantine first appeared in The Saga of Swamp Thing #37 (June 1985), and was created by Alan Moore, Rick Veitch, Steve Bissette, and John Totleben.

Dreams and nightmares
These inhabitants of the Dreaming are often gods, myths, and even ordinary human beings who later became dreams.

Cain and Abel

Cain and Abel are based on the Biblical Cain and Abel, adapted by editor Joe Orlando with Bob Haney (writer) and Jack Sparling (artist) (Cain), and Mark Hannerfeld (writer) and Bill Draut (artist) (Abel). They were depicted together in Abel's first appearance, and parted to their respective Houses at the end of the story. Although Cain would abuse Abel, he was not shown killing him until Swamp Thing vol. 2 #33. In Elvira's House of Mystery #11, Cain expresses shock at having killed his brother in recent times. In the same issue, a contest-winning letter establishes that Cain and the House exist both in the dream world and the real world, and that only in the dream world does Cain continue to harm Abel. In The Sandman, Cain is shown to kill Abel quite often. In issue #2, Lucien calls this unusual, and recent.

Before The Sandman
Originally they were the respective "hosts" of the EC-style horror comic anthologies House of Mystery and House of Secrets, which ran from the 1950s through 1983—Cain debuting in House of Mystery #175 (1968) and Abel in DC Special #4 and House of Secrets #81 (both 1969). During the 1970s, they also co-hosted the horror/humor anthology Plop!. They were also both recurring characters in DC's Elvira's House of Mystery (1986–88).

In 1985, the characters were revived by writer Alan Moore, who introduced them into his Swamp Thing series in issue #33, retelling the Swamp Thing's original origin story from a 1971 issue of House of Secrets. Gary Cohn and Dan Mishkin included them in the pages of Blue Devil in 1986. Jamie Delano also occasionally used them in a cameo role in his title Hellblazer.

In The Sandman
In Gaiman's Sandman universe, the biblical Cain and Abel live in the Dreaming at Dream's invitation. This is based on the verse in the Bible which says that Cain was sent to live in the Land of Nod. They live as neighbors in two houses near a graveyard: Cain in the broad House of Mystery and Abel in the tall House of Secrets. According to their appearance in Swamp Thing, the difference is that 'a mystery may be shared, but a secret must be forgotten if one tries to tell it'.

Gaiman's Cain is an aggressive, overbearing character. He is a thin, long-limbed man with an angular, drawn face, glasses, a tufty beard, and hair drawn into two points above his ears. He has been described by other characters as sounding "just like Vincent Price".

Gaiman's Abel is a nervous but kind-hearted man. He also has a stammer. He is somewhat similar in appearance to Cain, with a tufty beard and hair that comes to points above his ears, though his hair is black rather than brown. He is shorter and fatter than Cain, with a more open face. It is eventually learned that the only time he does not stutter is when he is telling a story or when he is dead.

Cain kills Abel frequently and in many brutal ways, whereupon Abel later returns to life. He often expresses hope for a more harmonious relationship with his brother. 

Cain and Abel own a large green draconic gargoyle named Gregory, who also made his debut in House of Mystery #175. In the first appearance of the characters in Sandman, issue #2, Cain gives Abel an egg that soon hatches into another gargoyle, a small golden one. Abel names the gargoyle "Irving". but Cain insists that the names of gargoyles must always begin with a "G.", and Abel (after another death and resurrection) renames the gargoyle "Goldie", after an invisible/imaginary friend to whom Abel told his early House of Secrets stories.  A letter in issue #91 was attributed to Goldie, who claimed that it was herself depicted on the cover of issue #88.

They shelter Dream until his strength is restored following his 72-year-long imprisonment. In the fourth story arc, Season of Mists, Cain is sent to Hell to give a message to Lucifer because Cain is protected by a curse that would deter Lucifer from harming him. Cain and Abel also aid The Corinthian with the child Daniel during The Kindly Ones, the penultimate story arc of the series. Abel is one of the victims of the Furies in this series, and is brought back to life by the new Dream.

Corinthian

The Corinthian is a nightmare created by Dream, of human appearance but with two small additional mouths in place of his eyes. He enjoys eating the eyeballs of people he kills. 
The first version of the Corinthian is destroyed by Dream for spending several unsupervised decades on Earth as a serial killer (in Dream's view, a waste of his potential), and it is shown in The Sandman: Overture (2013) that Dream intended to do this before his imprisonment. Near the end of the series Dream creates a second Corinthian, altering his personality to be obedient and useful rather than homicidal. In a later story in The Dreaming, the second Corinthian is haunted by the actions of the first.

Eve

Fiddler's Green
Fiddler's Green is a place in the Dreaming which all travellers (specifically sailors) dream of someday finding, which sometimes assumes human form and goes wandering, under the alias Gilbert; a kindly, portly man who, in appearance and behavior, resembles  G(ilbert) K. Chesterton. As 'Gilbert', Fiddler's Green accompanied Rose Walker to find her brother Jed, and gave her the means by which to summon Dream to rescue her from danger; and thereafter returned to the Dreaming. He was killed by the Three in The Kindly Ones, and refused to be resurrected by the new Dream.  Here, it is implied that he was "in love, a little" with Rose.

Stephen Fry portrays the character in the television series The Sandman on Netflix.

Gate Keepers
A wyvern, a griffin and a hippogriff are the guardians of Dream's castle. The hippogriff has a horse's head instead of the traditional eagle's head.
They derive all their power and authority from Dream, so when Dream was captured and lost his power, they could no longer guard or protect the Dreaming.

After the griffin was destroyed by the Furies, the new Dream did not remake him, but asked the gryphons of Greek myth to send one of their own. (#71)

Gregory

Goldie
Goldie is a fictional character in The Sandman comic book series by Neil Gaiman.

Goldie is a pet baby gargoyle, given to Abel by his brother Cain in Preludes and Nocturnes. Abel originally intends to name him Irving, but Cain insists that gargoyle names must all begin with a "G". Cain then proceeded to murder Abel over this. Abel soon returns, as he is murdered by Cain all the time. He then agrees to name the gargoyle Goldie, after "an old friend", though he tells Goldie in private that he will continue to think of him as Irving.

Goldie appears for a short scene in The Doll's House in which he is sitting upon Abel's shoulder as Lucien asks Abel about the inhabitants of the house. He later appears throughout the "Parliament of Rooks" story in Fables and Reflections, and briefly at the beginning of Brief Lives. He also accompanies Abel in The Kindly Ones and is with him when he gets murdered by the Furies, crying when his master is killed. He is later seen playing with Daniel Hall.

Goldie later takes on a pivotal role as the guardian of the tree of life in the Sandman spin-off series The Dreaming. On his/her quest to the tree, a search party forms. He was retconned into a female gargoyle for the new series.

Goldie is named after the "'imaginary' friend" to whom Abel would tell his early stories in the pages of House of Secrets.

In issue 39 of the 2008 reboot of the House of Mystery comic series, it is revealed that Goldie is "Gigi", a waitress at the House of Mystery and a bit player in the series.  Goldie was transformed by Lotus Blossom, another character in the series, at Goldie's request in exchange for a book of magic spells.  Goldie was not enthralled with the idea of growing up to be a gargoyle, and instead wanted to be a human girl.  The newly reborn Gigi joined Lotus Blossom on her exploits in the series, often serving as an enforcer for her.  It is revealed that Abel knows Gigi's true history, but if his brother Cain knew, it was not shown.

Lucien
Lucien is the chief librarian in The Dreaming, and is a tall thin, bookish man.  He first appeared in Weird Mystery Tales #18 (May 1975) and was apparently killed in Secrets of Haunted House #44 (January 1982).

Like Cain and Abel, Lucien, created by Paul Levitz, Nestor Redondo, and Joe Orlando, was originally the host of a 1970s "weird tales" comic, specifically the three-issue Tales of Ghost Castle (May/June–October 1975). In that series, he is portrayed as the guardian of a castle in Transylvania abandoned by both sides during World War II, watching over its forgotten library with his companion, a werewolf named Rover. In his first appearance in Preludes and Nocturnes (issue #2) this is retroactively revealed to be Dream's castle.

Lucien is the effective keeper of the Dreaming in Dream's absence, and becomes one of Dream's most faithful and trusted servants after proving his loyalty by never abandoning his post during that period. His primary function is to protect the Library, wherein are contained all the books that have ever been dreamed of, including the ones that have never been written. The titles of some of these books, many of which are sequels to real works, are visible.  He is, despite his frail appearance, apparently quite capable in combat, "[dealing] with" several unpleasant creatures who escape imprisonment during the events of The Kindly Ones.

In issue #68, it is revealed that Lucien's existence in the Dreaming began as serving the role of Dream's first raven. When writing The Sandman Companion, author Hy Bender interpreted this as meaning that Lucien was also the first man. An allusion to "Mr. Raven", the ghostly librarian in George MacDonald's novel Lilith, may be intended.

Lucienne
In January 2021, Vivienne Acheampong was announced to star in The Sandman TV series from Netflix portraying Lucienne, a gender-reversed version of Lucien.

Matthew

Matthew is the raven companion of Dream of the Endless.

Matthew was originally Matthew Cable, a long-time supporting character in the Swamp Thing series, but because he died while asleep in the Dreaming, he was offered the chance to become a dream raven and serve Dream if he wished, and he accepted.

Matthew is not the first of Morpheus' ravens. Former ravens include Aristeas of Marmora, who returned to his life as a man for one year at one point, and Lucien, the first of the ravens. Morpheus seems to keep the ravens around out of some sort of unspoken need for companionship, though he also sends them on occasional missions.

Matthew's word balloons and font style are scratchy and uneven, probably to represent a hoarse, cawing voice, and perhaps as an indicator of his crude, smart-aleck personality. Underneath his frequently irreverent manner, Matthew is actually very loyal to Dream, and he is one of the characters who takes it the hardest when Dream perishes, initially seeking release from his service, but eventually coming to terms with his loss and choosing to remain as Daniel's raven.

Mervyn Pumpkinhead
Mervyn "Merv" Pumpkinhead  is Dream's cantankerous, cigar-smoking janitor: an animated scarecrow whose head is a jack-o'-lantern. He resembles Jack Pumpkinhead of L. Frank Baum's Oz books.

Mervyn is first seen in Preludes and Nocturnes, driving a bus on which Dream travels. Thereafter Merv is in charge of the construction, maintenance, and demolition work in the Dreaming, though he sometimes complains that his job is superfluous because Dream can change any of the Dreaming at will. One issue of the Dreaming spin-off comic focuses on a dreamer who enjoys working under Merv's supervision.

Mervyn was one of the few who took arms against the Furies in The Kindly Ones, but was easily killed. He is returned to life by the new Dream in The Wake.

In a past incarnation shown in The Wake, Mervyn was seen to have had a turnip for a head instead of a pumpkin, as pumpkins were not then known in Europe.

Kevin Smith voices Mervyn in the Audible adaptation. In the Netflix series, he is voiced by Mark Hamill.

Minor dreams
 Brute and Glob: Two troublemaking nightmares who try to gain power during Dream's absence. They originally appeared in Jack Kirby's 1974 Sandman series, as sidekicks to the title character, and continued as such when Hector Hall became the Sandman in Infinity Inc.. In the original comics, Brute was similar to The Thing, shouted "It's clobberin' time!" and often referred to his Uncle Harry. In The Doll's House, it is revealed that they controlled the Sandmen in secret; whereupon Dream exiled them to "the darkness" (a place of imprisonment and, presumably, torture, within the Dreaming). Near the end of The Kindly Ones, the Furies tell Dream that they have released his prisoners from the darkness, but Brute and Glob are neither mentioned nor seen in this volume or in The Wake. They next appear in The Dreaming #57–60, The Sandman Presents: Everything You Always Wanted To Know About Dreams...But Were Afraid to Ask, and Lucifer #15, where they attempt to kidnap Elaine Belloc. They subsequently reappear in JSA #64, again trying to manipulate a human connected to the Dreaming (Sandy Hawkins) into their own "Sandman"; but Daniel, Dream's heir, returns them to the darkness. The two entities claim this area of darkness is filled with pleasing childhood dreams, which they despise. First appearance:  The Sandman vol. 1, #1.
 The Cuckoo: A parasitic dream who has conquered Barbie's dreamworld in A Game of You. She assumes the form of a childhood version of Barbie and uses her self proclaimed "adorableness" to escape from Barbie's dream world, at which point she transforms into a bird.
 The Fashion Thing: A minor character whose form changes based on popular fads. She is based on The Mad Mod Witch, created by Dave Wood and Jack Sparling as the host of The Unexpected, another DC horror title. At the time of her first appearance in Sandman, she is a "Mad Yuppie Witch". First appearance: The Unexpected #108. Most of her appearances are relegated to a few panels. She is shown flying on her broom as a Yuppie briefly in issue #2, shown riding her broom in a top hat and tails with bare legs and feet in issue #22, and shown topless serving a meal to Delirium and Dream in issue #42.  She also appears in The Kindly Ones.
 Judge Gallows appears in several issues of The Dreaming including the Special, "Trial and Error".  Introduced in The Unexpected #113 (June–July 1969), he is one of the few DC "mystery" hosts not used by Gaiman.
Gault: appears in the Sandman Netflix series. A nightmare who fled the Dreaming in the wake of Morpheus's imprisonment and hides away in the mind of Jed Walker. She created a fantasy world for the boy where he is a hero known as the "Sandman" as an escape from his abuse in the waking world. She is eventually tracked down and, when confronted reveals her desire to be a dream, wishing to inspire rather than frighten.

Gods, demigods, and major personifications

Bast
Bast, in Neil Gaiman's comic book series The Sandman, is the DC Universe version of the goddess Bast of Egyptian mythology. She was once a major goddess, but the loss of her believers over time has significantly reduced her powers. She is often coquettish toward Dream, who sometimes goes to her for advice or companionship; but she has often claimed never to have been his lover. Bast has also appeared in issues of Wonder Woman and Hawkgirl, wherein she is one of the chief goddesses worshiped by the Amazons of Bana-Mighdall. She appears in Sandman Presents: Bast: Eternity Game (2003), where she attempts to regain her lost power.

The Presence/The Creator

The Presence is the Sandman universe's equivalent of a Supreme Being, and he shares many characteristics with the standard Abrahamic God, such as almost never taking a physical form, being a Creator deity, and having unmatched power. Nevertheless, Gaiman has on several occasions stated that he never intended the Creator to be any specific religion's god, just as he makes it clear in the first appearance of the abode of the angels, the Silver City, that it "is not Paradise. It is not Heaven. It is the Silver City, that is not part of the order of created things", although the Silver City is often identified as "Heaven" in the Lucifer comic book series.

In that series, one of the critical turning points is the Presence's abandonment of his Creation, which leads to a large number of problems, including struggles to claim the power that the Creator has abandoned, to make the destruction of the universe inevitable and to the slow unraveling of the universe due to the disappearance of the Name of the Creator written on every atom in existence. This is an ongoing storyline in Lucifer.

Loki
Loki is a trickster god seen in Season of Mists; based on the Norse god Loki. In his own form, Loki is a tall, thin man with yellow eyes and long red hair that resembles flames; but he is capable of assuming any appearance at will. He is sometimes nicknamed 'Lie-Smith' and 'Sky-walker' by other characters.

In The Sandman
He is temporarily freed from his punishment by Odin to accompany his negotiations for the rulership of Hell; whereafter he deceives Odin and Thor into imprisoning another god in his place, but fails to fool Dream, who frees the other god and sends a simulacrum of Loki to take his punishment, in exchange for Loki's debt to himself.  Loki returns in The Kindly Ones, wherein he works with Puck to kidnap Daniel, a child under Dream's protection. The Corinthian and Matthew eventually find Daniel, and Loki attempts to fool them by taking the form of Dream; but the Corinthian strangles Loki and consumes his eyes. Loki, now blind, is taken by Odin and Thor back to his punishment.

After The Sandman
Loki reappears in Lucifer, wherein Lucifer comes to Loki to take his ship for his own universe, and destroys the snake that tortures Loki, who therefore allows him the ship.

Odin
Odin, as based on the Norse God Odin, appears as an old man wearing a wide-brimmed hat and cloak and carrying a staff. He is usually depicted as a dark, mysterious figure, missing one eye and accompanied by two ravens, Hugin and Munin ("thought" and "memory"), and two wolves, Geri and Freki.

Three
The Three appear in the form of any group of three women; usually the Mother, the Maiden and the Crone, the three aspects of the Triple Goddess in many mythologies.  Sometimes they appear in the form of the three witches from DC's horror anthology, The Witching Hour:  Mildred, Mordred, and Cynthia.  As these witches, they also appeared in a prestige format limited series of the same title, and two standard limited series, Witchcraft and Witchcraft:  Le Terreur.

In The Sandman
The Three repeatedly appear throughout The Sandman, fulfilling different functions at different points in the story. Their first appearance is in The Sandman #2, where they appear as the three witches, Mildred (mother), Mordred (crone), and Cynthia (maiden) from the DC horror anthology The Witching Hour. They later take many different forms over the course of the series, and the "three women" symbol remains an extremely common one, often blurring the lines between when characters are supposed to be merely themselves and when they are supposed to be representations of the Three. The Three represent the female principle, prophecy, and mystery, and they are often a vaguely menacing and enigmatic presence in the series. Incarnations of the Three include the Erinyes (Furies) in their vengeful aspect and the Moirai (Fates) or Weird Sisters in their divinatory aspect. They also sometimes subtly appear in the form of other characters (such as Eve) or groups of characters.

After The Sandman
The Three later appeared in a graphic novel named WitchCraft, in which one of their priestesses in ancient Rome, Ursula, is raped by barbarians. She is then reincarnated three times, followed by the witches, and wronged again by reincarnations of the barbarian leader until the modern age, when she comes back as his elderly mother-in-law and manages to defeat him.

The Three then assure that he would be reincarnated as each of the priestesses he had raped, in order, with the exception of Ursula. He would never know what was happening until the moment of death, at which point it would start all over again.

The Three are satisfied, and in the end decide that Ursula will live another twenty years and become an accomplished and respected witch in her twilight years, and her grandchild will be beautiful.

Other gods
 Ishtar: The goddess Ishtar, disguised as an exotic dancer; a former lover of Destruction.
 Pharamond: a former god, last of his pantheon, and friend of Dream. At Dream's suggestion that he change with the times or fade like many other gods, Pharamond now runs a travel agency in Dublin, under the alias 'Mr Farrell'. He helps Dream and Delirium find the missing Destruction, and later provides assistance to Lucifer in his own series.
 Thor: The Norse god Thor first appeared in DC Comics in Tales of the Unexpected #16 (August 1957), "The Magic Hammer," illustrated by Jack Kirby.  In another story attributed to Kirby and George Papp, "The Magic Stick" in House of Mystery #68 (November 1957), he looked like a traditional Viking with red hair, and his hammer looked identical to the way Kirby would draw it for Marvel Comics.  That story was reprinted in DC Special #4 (July 1969), which also contains Abel's debut. Kirby also pitted Wesley Dodds against someone claiming to be Thor in Adventure Comics #75 (June 1942).  Later, a museum worker handled Thor's hammer and briefly became Thor in Batman #127 (October 1959). Thor also appears in War of the Gods and Jack Kirby's Fourth World. (The Thor seen in The Sandman does not resemble the one seen in the other DC comics.)

Angels, fallen angels, and devils

Azazel
Azazel is a former ruler of Hell, reigning for a time alongside Lucifer and Beelzebub.  Based on a statement from Agony and Ecstasy in Hellblazer #12, he may have usurped his position from Belial (described at the time was the third member of the triumvirate).  He appears as a ragged opening into darkness, full of disembodied eyes and mouths. He was cast out after Lucifer abandoned Hell, and later imprisoned by Dream in a glass jar. He reappears, still in Dream's glass jar, in Lucifer Volume 2 (2015).

He is based on the demon Azazel.

Azazel first appeared in DC Comics battling Madame Xanadu in the story intended for Doorway to Nightmare #6 (it was cancelled after #5) that was eventually published in Cancelled Comic Cavalcade #2 and The Unexpected #190.  As with Lucifer's appearance in The Brave and the Bold, he looked more like a traditional devil, but was identified as an incubus: here, a creature who steals people's dreams and imprints them upon tapestries that give him power, and cannot be destroyed without killing the victims.

Beelzebub
Along with Lucifer and Azazel, Beelzebub was the third King of Hell. He often appears as either a gigantic green fly, or a fly's head on two short human legs.  Sometimes a human face can be seen between the fly's eyes.  His constant buzzing slurs his speech (for example, 'Bbbbut nooo. Itzzz a Triummmvirate.') He is based on the demon Beelzebub.

Choronzon
Choronzon is a former duke of Hell who served under Beelzebub. He has pink skin and two mouths, one under the other.

He had possession of Dream's helm, but lost it in a challenge. He later reappeared briefly as one of Azazel's tactics to gain ownership of Hell.

He is based on the demon Choronzon.

Choronzon appears in 52 #25 (Late October 2006).

Duma
Duma is a fallen angel from the DC Vertigo series The Sandman. Duma's name means "silence", and he is based on the angel Duma from Jewish mythology. In Season of Mists, Lucifer abdicates Hell and gives the key to Dream until God assigns Duma and Remiel to control of Hell. Remiel and Duma lose ownership of Hell in the Lucifer spin-off series. Duma eventually allies with Lucifer and Elaine Belloc to save creation, and persuades Hell's new ruler Christopher Rudd to bring his army to Heaven's aid at the Battle of Armageddon.

Lucifer

Lucifer is the sometime ruler of Hell, and a fallen angel. He is based on the fallen angel Lucifer, whose story was created by John Milton in his epic poem Paradise Lost. Neil Gaiman also used the character Lucifer in his short story 'Murder Mysteries', wherein he was a captain in the Silver City, with Azazel as his protégé.

In the book "Hanging out with the Dream King" (a book consisting of interviews with Gaiman's collaborators), one of Gaiman's artists, Kelley Jones, states that Lucifer's appearance is based on that of David Bowie:

"...Neil was adamant that the Devil was David Bowie. He just said, 'He is. You must draw David Bowie. Find David Bowie, or I'll send you David Bowie. Because if it isn't David Bowie, you're going to have to redo it until it is David Bowie.' So I said, 'Okay, it's David Bowie.'..."

Lucifer made at least three previous appearances in DC Comics (Superman's Pal Jimmy Olsen #65, Weird Mystery Tales #4, and DC Special Series #8, a.k.a. The Brave and the Bold Special), but his appearance was more traditional.  Lucifer as he appeared in The Sandman also appeared in issues of the series The Demon (vol. 3) and The Spectre (vol. 2) and in the miniseries Stanley and His Monster (vol. 2).

Mazikeen

Mazikeen is a fictional character from Neil Gaiman's Sandman mythos. The name "Mazikeen" comes from that of a shapeshifting demon of Jewish mythology.

In The Sandman
Mazikeen first appeared in The Sandman, where she was Lucifer's consort while he reigned in Hell. At the time, half of her face was normal, but the other half was horribly misshapen and skeletal, causing her speech to be nearly unintelligible. (Gaiman wrote Mazikeen's dialogue by trying to speak using only half of his mouth, and writing down phonetically what came out.)

When Lucifer resigned, Mazikeen left Hell and ended up following her master, becoming part of the staff at the "Lux" (Latin for light, and the first root word in "Lucifer"), an elite Los Angeles bar that Lucifer had opened and played piano at. To conceal her demonic nature, she covered the deformed half of her face with a white mask and rarely spoke.

After The Sandman
In the ongoing comic book series Lucifer, Mazikeen is a devoted ally of Lucifer Morningstar and the war leader of the Lilin, a race descended from Lilith. A fearsome warrior and a respected leader, Mazikeen is a prominent character in the Lucifer comics. She has the appearance of a human female with long black hair.

In Lucifer, Mazikeen's face was turned fully human when she was resuscitated by the Basanos following the destruction of the Lux in a fire. This was because the vessel of the Basanos, Jill Presto, did not realize that Mazikeen's face was naturally deformed, and assumed that it was burned in the fire.

When Lucifer refused to assist her in restoring her face to its former state, she defected to her family, the Lilim-in-Exile. As their war leader, she led their army against Lucifer's cosmos, allying herself briefly with the Basanos. However, this was a ruse; after a desperate gamble, she bought Lucifer enough time to destroy the Basanos and regain control of his creation. Lucifer then accepted her into his service once more and made the Lilim-in-Exile the standing army of his universe.

Lucifer ultimately restores Mazikeen's half-skeletal face shortly before departing the known universes.

Remiel
Remiel is an angel in the comic book series The Sandman; based on the angel Remiel. He first appears in Season of Mists.  In Biblical and Judaic traditions, Remiel is an Archangel and a Grigori; a Choir/Hierarchy of angels, whose role is to observe humanity, lending a helping hand when necessary but not interfere.

In The Sandman
Remiel, along with Duma, is sent to observe when Dream is given the key to Hell. Dream finally gives the key to Remiel and Duma, and the two angels descend to Hell to rule over the countless sinners and demons there.

After The Sandman
Following the end of the Sandman series, Remiel and Duma lose ownership of Hell in the Lucifer spin-off series. At the end of the series, Remiel tries to rebel against Elaine Belloc, refusing to accept her as God's successor. When he tries to kill Gaudium and Spera, friends of Elaine's, she puts him in his own Hell until he reforms.

Minor angels and demons
 Merkin, Mother of Spiders: First appeared in Season of Mists, as an envoy with Azazel. A lumpen, hideous, vaguely feminine figure, whose womb produces spiders. The Merkin's facial form was almost certainly based upon a photograph by the artist Joel-Peter Witkin entitled "Amour, New Mexico, 1987", showing a naked female figure wearing a spider-like horned mask.

Fair Folk
Inhabitants of Faerie.

Cluracan
The Cluracan is a courtier of the Queen of Faerie and the brother to Nuala, the Dream King's fairy servant. An amoral, merry, capricious, homosexual rogue, Cluracan features in Season of Mists, Worlds' End, The Kindly Ones, and The Wake. He is strongly reminiscent of the "trickster" archetype also associated with Loki. Following the events of The Kindly Ones, Cluracan offends his queen so badly that she sends him to the court of Llinor, where tradition demands that he marry a lady of the royal house; whereupon Cluracan's nemesis – identical to him in every way except his sexual orientation – takes Cluracan's place.

The Cluracan is named after a drunken leprechaun of Irish mythology, the Cluricaun.

Nuala

Nuala is a faerie given to Dream at the end of Season of Mists, who takes on the housekeeping duties of the Dreaming, only stopping when her brother Cluracan takes her back to Faerie in The Kindly Ones. When she leaves, Dream grants her permission to summon him at need; and when she asks to become his paramour, he refuses.

She subsequently appears in the Sandman spinoff series, The Dreaming.

Auberon
Auberon is a character in the comic book series The Sandman and The Books of Magic. He is seen for the first time in Sandman#19 as Auberon of Dom-Daniel, and again in several issues of The Books of Magic and in the Books of Faerie miniseries.

The character was inspired by Oberon of Shakespeare's A Midsummer Night's Dream.

Titania

Titania is a character in Neil Gaiman's comic book series The Sandman.

In The Sandman
Titania is the queen of the fay; she first appears in issue#19. The character was inspired by Shakespeare's Titania (Fairy Queen) in the play A Midsummer Night's Dream.  There is implication that she in the past was a lover of Dream's, although this is never confirmed.

After The Sandman
Titania is also a major character in the comic book The Books of Magic, of which the first four issues were written by Gaiman, and its spin-off series The Books of Faerie. In the latter series, it is revealed that she was a human girl who crossed over into the fay realm and was then adopted by the previous queen of the fay, and received her faerie powers from a circlet seized by her from that queen. Despite this power, it was revealed that she is illiterate, and so regularly uses Dream's library because its special properties allow its users to read books in any language, including those they cannot speak. There are suggestions that she may be the mother of the series' protagonist, Timothy Hunter.

Puck
Puck is a brown-furred trickster and hobgoblin, who appears several times in The Sandman. Puck aids the Norse God Loki in kidnapping Daniel, playing a small role in the death of the Sandman and Daniel's subsequent assuming of the title. Puck later appeared in an issue of The Books of Magic, hiding as a gangster called Mr. Robbins in Brighton whose true nature is discovered—but not exposed—by Timothy Hunter. The character was inspired by Puck of Shakespeare's A Midsummer Night's Dream.

Immortals, witches, and long-lived humans

Hob Gadling

Robert "Hob" Gadling is a human granted immortality, who meets with Dream once every hundred years.

Hob was granted immortality in a pub named the White Horse in 1389 when he simply declared that he "had decided never to die"; whereupon Death agrees, at Dream's request, to forgo him.  Hob thereupon takes to a variety of occupations over the centuries, including slaving, and periodically reinvents himself as a descendant of his previous persona.  Gradually, he acquires a conscience, and by the 20th Century has become full of remorse at his past deeds. Dream converses with Gadling once per century, of Gadling's latest occupations. At their 20th Century meeting, Dream admits that the purpose of the exercise was simply for him to have a friend. In The Wake, Death offers to end his six-hundred-year life; but Gadling declines.

Orpheus
Orpheus is the son of Dream and the muse Calliope. He is based on Orpheus of Greek mythology.

In "The Song of Orpheus", the Endless attend Orpheus's wedding to Eurydice. Eurydice dies on the same night, and Orpheus asks his father to retrieve her from Hades. Dream refuses, but Orpheus gets help from Destruction and Death. As in the legend, Orpheus travels to Hades, plays his sad music, loses Eurydice again, and gets torn apart by the Bacchanae (the beloved madwomen of Dionysus) but because of his immortality survives as a disembodied head. Dream establishes a priesthood to take care of his son, saying that they will never meet again.

In "Thermidor", Johanna Constantine is asked by Dream to rescue Orpheus from Revolutionary France. Orpheus's singing stuns Robespierre and Louis de Saint-Just, leading to the Thermidorian Reaction. Orpheus misses his father, who still has not visited him.

In Brief Lives, Dream has to talk to Orpheus in order to find Destruction. In return, Orpheus is granted his wish of death.

Thessaly
Thessaly is the last of the millennia-old witches of Thessaly. She makes her first appearance in A Game of You. She has a bookish appearance with straight hair and thick glasses that belie her personality: amoral, cold-blooded, proud, and ruthless, though not malicious. She will kill people who are potential threats with no hesitation or remorse.

Neil Gaiman named this character after the land of witches, Thessaly, in Greece. In one of Plato's dialogues, the Gorgias, Socrates states "I would not have us risk that which is dearest on the acquisition of this power, like the Thessalian enchantresses, who, as they say, bring down the moon from heaven at the risk of their own perdition." In the series, Thessaly does exactly that, with deadly consequences, just as Socrates predicts. Later in the series, Thessaly changes her name to Larissa, which is the capital of Thessaly. Larissa was actually the local fountain nymph, after whom the town was named.  It is suggested however that Thessaly is even older than this civilization and may date from Neolithic times.

Thessaly returns in the later volumes, where she is Dream's lover for a time, but this relationship ends unhappily for both and is never actually shown in the series. When it is alluded to in Brief Lives Thessaly is never mentioned by name, so only in The Kindly Ones is this romance revealed. Also in The Kindly Ones, Thessaly provides Lyta Hall with protection and sanctuary from Dream while he is being targeted for death by the Furies, who are using Hall as a vessel.

In The Wake she attends Dream's wake and funeral.  She speaks with two of Dream's lovers and recalls her relationship with Dream.  She remarks that part of his attraction to her was that she was not intimidated by him.  To her surprise she later would dream of Morpheus, and the two kindled a romance, with Dream madly in love with Thessaly (though this affection was not mutual).  When Morpheus ended his courtship and resumed working Thessaly realized she did not love Morpheus and left the Dreaming.

When Lyta wakes up after Dream's death, Thessaly calmly advises her to leave. Thessaly suggests that many people, including herself, would be more than happy to murder Lyta for her part in Morpheus' destruction.

Thessaly also is the star of two spin-off comic series, The Thessaliad and Thessaly, Witch for Hire written by Bill Willingham. In the spin-offs, Thessaly (under that name) and her companion, a ghost named Fetch, first set out to tackle various gods of the underworld who want her dead. Later she is unwillingly pressured into a monster-killing contract.

She is alluded to in the Faction Paradox series, in the character Thessalia and her protégé Larissa.

Mad Hettie

A London tramp born in 1741. At the time of Sandman #3, she was 247 years old. She appears frequently in other DC comics such as Hellblazer, first appearing in #9. She also had a large role in Death: The High Cost of Living, where she is shown to be rude, miserly and constantly complains about the lack of knowledge that present day youths have. She has been accused of being a witch, and also appears to have abilities as a haruspex, however she merely states that "you don't get to your two hundred and fiftieth without learning a few tricks".

Later, Hettie worked in the series The Dreaming, in which it was discovered that she had dealings with Destiny, Johanna Constantine and President Thomas Jefferson.

In The Sandman: Overture, it is revealed that she had stolen a magical timepiece in her youth, which remained hidden in her memories until Daniel retrieved it.

The Silk Man
Appearing for the first time in Lucifer: Nirvana, The Silk Man is an immortal sorcerer, described by Lucifer as "..a fossil remnant from an earlier, cruder creation. His body is a weaving that has to be renewed constantly. His spirit too, come to that. A messy form of immortality, but it seems to do the job." In earlier days he was the leader of the Arao Jinn. He appears as a mercenary, hired by the angel Perdissa to kill Lucifer. He seems to need to consume living things to stay alive, weaving them into himself. He is severely damaged by Perdissa and eventually killed by Lucifer.

Vassily
In The Hunt, Vassily appears as an old man telling his teen-aged granddaughter a tale from "the old country", medieval Russia.  A youth raised in a remote forest has a series of adventures, including meeting with Lucien (to whom he gives a book) and Baba Yaga, and marrying a fellow shape-changing wolf.  At the end of the story, it is revealed that the grandfather is the youth in his own story.

Mortals

Alex Burgess
Alex Burgess is the son of Roderick Burgess, mother unknown (but probably Ethel Cripps, and therefore half-brother of Doctor Destiny). He is taught by his father, and takes part in his rituals. Upon Roderick Burgess' death, Alex inherits his estate, including his magical order. He keeps Dream imprisoned, as his father did, trying to bargain for power and immortality in exchange for Dream's release.

The Order of the Ancient Mysteries enjoys a resurgence in popularity in the 1960s, but by the 1970s it is in decline again. Alex passes ownership of the Order on to his boyfriend, Paul McGuire, and becomes obsessed with his prisoner and with his father. Finally, in 1988, Dream escapes and puts Alex into a nightmare of "eternal waking," in which he is forever dreaming he is waking up, and each waking degenerates into another horrible nightmare. This nightmare lasts for years, ending only with Dream's death in The Kindly Ones.

Alex is quite tall and near-sighted. He has brown hair which he wears in a variety of styles throughout his life, but by old age he is bald and has come to resemble his father very closely. His relationship with McGuire is deep and heartfelt, but his obsessions with his father and with Dream eventually come to rule his life. In The Wake, he appears again as the child that we see in his first appearance.

Alex is in many ways a tragic figure, perhaps the first statement of the theme that Desire explores in The Wake : "The bonds of family bind both ways". Had Alex not been born the son of his father, inheriting the imprisoned Dream, his life might have been much happier. However, he is finally able to find some measure of fulfillment in his old age, following Dream's death.

His name almost certainly derives from Anthony Burgess's A Clockwork Orange, the protagonist of which is named Alex, but could also be a nod to Aleister Crowley, whose original middle name was Alexander and who was mentioned in the first issue.

Roderick Burgess
Roderick Burgess (1863–1947), born Morris Burgess Brocklesby and known also as The Daemon King, was the Lord Magus of The Order of the Ancient Mysteries. His magical fraternity was based in "Fawney Rig" in Sussex, and was initially funded by his inherited industrial wealth. Burgess is a magician rather in the vein of the real Aleister Crowley, and within the DC world is Crowley's rival.

The series begins with Burgess' attempt to capture and bind Death, which fails, capturing Dream instead. Burgess keeps Dream trapped in a glass globe for the rest of his (Burgess') life, attempting to bargain with Dream, but Dream remains silent. Burgess dies from a heart attack still attempting to get a response out of Dream. His order passes the globe and Dream to his son Alex.

Burgess is a bald-headed, slightly pot-bellied man with a large hook nose. He is ultimately self-centred; his sole purpose for the Order is to bring money and power to himself, and he is consumed by his desire to achieve immortality. His relationship with his son is only briefly touched on, though it is implied that it is unhealthy, with Burgess pushing his son to spend his life pursuing his father's dreams.

Charles Dance portrays the character in the television series The Sandman on Netflix. This version of the character dies of a brain haemorrhage instead of a heart attack.

Johanna Constantine
Lady Johanna Constantine is an 18th-century supernatural adventuress. Dream encounters her several times, once to ask her to recover the head of his son, Orpheus – a mission she performed so successfully that part of its aftereffects was the ending of the French Revolution's Reign of Terror.

After The Sandman

In the Hellblazer Special: Lady Constantine graphic novel, an ancient evil refers to Johanna Constantine as 'the Constantine', the 'laughing magician', and the 'constant one', all titles that have been used (usually by other ancient evils) to describe John Constantine.  The evil taunts her, saying "did you think to trick us with a new form?"  There is the implication that throughout all times there have been recurring incarnations of Constantine who contain the spark of magic.  In the story Johanna Constantine learns that "the Devil and the Wandering Jew" meet once every hundred years in a London pub; this meeting is actually between Dream and Hob Gadling, as she discovers when she interrupts the meeting. The story's conclusion shows Johanna Constantine inheriting a property she calls "Fawney Rig", after the con job wherein a gilded ring is sold as though it were solid gold, the implication being that she attained the property through trickery.  This property was later owned by Roderick Burgess, the mage who captured Dream in the beginning of The Sandman story.

In her middle age, Johanna Constantine is charged by persons unknown with the key to a box containing the sigil of America, allegedly created by Destiny. This is stolen and hidden in the future by the wanderer, Mad Hettie. Hettie both blackmails ('I knows about you and the little Corsican') and bribes Johanna for her silence, promising her that she would live to age 99.  This promise proves true, with Johanna dying at age 99 while getting out of her wheelchair when she hears the song of her old companion, Orpheus.

Johanna is an ancestor of John Constantine, as revealed in the miniseries The Sandman Presents: Love Street.

She is also mentioned in the Doctor Who novel The Man in the Velvet Mask, set in an alternate post-Revolutionary France.

Jenna Coleman was cast as two versions of Johanna, one in the eighteenth-century and another in the present day in the TV adaptation of The Sandman where she's a occult detective just like John.

John Constantine

John Constantine is a con man and magician who accompanies Dream on a quest to find his pouch of sand.

John Constantine has his own series, John Constantine: Hellblazer, which occasionally has guest appearances by Cain and Abel. He is also prominently featured in another series, Swamp Thing, from which he originated.

Ethel Cripps
Ethel Cripps, also known as Ethel Dee, is the mother of John Dee. She was the mistress of Roderick Burgess until she fled with Ruthven Sykes.

Her last joy was her son, John Dee, whom she sought for 10 years. She discovered that he had become a living corpse, which happened because of his use of the Sandman's Ruby.

At this time, she was 90 years old, and it was alluded that she had been kept alive by an amulet in the shape of an eye which granted its user protection, the amulet that Ruthven Sykes had been given by the demon Choronzon in exchange for Dream's helmet. Sykes, who had been second in command in The Order of Ancient Mysteries, needed protection from Roderick Burgess who was seeking retribution for Sykes' treachery of the theft of the £200,000 and Dream's magical items, which were in possession of the Order at the time he fled with Ethel Cripps to San Francisco in 1930.  "Magical War" was declared upon them, and Ruthven knew he would need a way to protect himself from the hexes Burgess sought to put upon him.

In 1936, Ethel walked out on Ruthven, taking with her the amulet of protection and Dream's Ruby.  While in his possession, the amulet protected Sykes from Burgess' hexes, but without it, he died a messy and painful death, with his insides exploding out of him.  The amulet continued to protect Ethel while Choronzon was still in possession of Dream's helmet.

After Dream escaped and sought to regain his items, he descended to Hell to find his helmet. He had to battle Choronzon to regain it, and after his victory, the compact was withdrawn and the power of protection the amulet possessed ended, which also ended the life of Ethel Dee.

Doctor Dee

John Dee, also known as Doctor Destiny, is a DC Comics villain whose powers were derived from his use of Dream's Ruby. His name is almost certainly a reference to the real-life John Dee. He was incarcerated in Arkham Asylum, with other Batman villains such as The Scarecrow and The Joker, until freed by the amulet given to him by his mother, Ethel Dee, former mistress to Roderick Burgess.  He had previously fought the Sandman (Garrett Sanford) alongside the Justice League.

John originally named himself 'Doctor Destiny' to protect his mother's surname, but after her death changed it back. The Ruby had drained away his mental and physical state until he was no longer able to sleep or dream without it. This had the unpleasant effect of turning him into a browned, living corpse.

Being able to control dreams, he used the ruby to bring out the 'darkness' and 'bestiality' of many people across the world. He originally sought power, money and mostly the restoration of his human body, but the madness brought about by overuse of the relic drove him to savage, monstruous acts of depravity using the ruby. To quote: 'I think I'll dismember the world and then I'll dance in the wreckage.'

While doing this, over a period of 24 hours he focused the energy of the ruby on several people in a cafe, one of them a friend of Rose Walker and an ex-lover of Foxglove. He used them as puppets, horribly having them murder and degrade each other as if they were toys, until all were dead.

Dream double-bluffed him into destroying the ruby, which Dee believed to be Dream's life. It actually only stored some of his energy, and with it released Dream instead became even more powerful than before. Easily overpowering Dee, Dream decided not to destroy him, and instead returned him to Arkham. Dee was finally able to sleep, and his sadism and depravity faded as he now could again dream.

He has since appeared in Justice League and Justice Society stories, having retained some residual power from the ruby. Even worse, since he has managed to replicate its power perfectly, the second ruby is now out of his grasp. However, since the new ruby is attuned to him, he has since not regressed to his previous vicious persona, mostly seeking the dominion of dreams or the waking world through dreams.

Wesley Dodds

Wesley Dodds, also known as Sandman, is the original costumed crimefighter who used the name. According to Gaiman, he was merely filling a hole in the universe in a similar way to a process of evolution, in which animals fill up a niche—for instance, what should fly. He is first seen in The Sandman series in a two-panel cameo in issue #1, and another cameo in issue #26. Dream occasionally appeared in dream sequences in Dodds's own series, Sandman Mystery Theatre. The two finally met for real in Gaiman's Sandman Midnight Theatre. Dodds appeared out of costume during The Sandman: The Wake (#72). The reason for his prophetic visions is explained as him being embodied with a small portion of Dream's essence. His reasoning for assuming his role as The Sandman is given as nightmares of Dream in his helmet that plague him, until he begins his career as a crimefighter, after which "Wesley Dodds sleeps the sleep of the Just."

Maddison Flynn

A young woman who first appears in Nightmare Country who has had her connection to the Dreaming tampered with by unseen forces. Consequently she has not been able to enter the Dreaming proper since she was a young child. For much of her adult life she has been plagued with visions of the Smiling Man; a rouge dreamlike entity that she wrote off as a product of depression. She would paint pictures of the entity to cope; an act which drew the attention of both the Corinthian and unseen forces who seek to eliminate those who have had contact with the entity. 

She is targeted by a pair of demonic assassins who send one of her classmates who they had murdered as a proxy to kill her when they are ordered to back down by their employer. After a confrontation where the Corinthian is forced to call in Morpheus for help she is badly wounded by her reanimated friend and ends up in Limbo where she is made an offer by Morpheus to help the Corinthian track down the Smiling man in return for a second chance at life. She agrees and is directly taken to the Dreaming to get a new body to throw off her pursuers.

Foxglove

Foxglove (Donna Cavanagh) is a writer and musician who first appears in A Game of You.

She is mentioned in Preludes and Nocturnes as the girlfriend of Judy, one of the patrons at the diner who dies in the story concerning John Dee, titled "24 Hours."  In A Game of You, she lives with her partner Hazel and the two help Thessaly rescue Barbie.

After The Sandman
In Death: The Time of Your Life, Foxglove has become a pop superstar after being seen by a promoter in Death: The High Cost of Living. She is raising a child with Hazel named Alvie.  Alvie dies of cot death, leading Hazel to make a deal with Death. However, even in the world of the Endless there is no such thing as a free lunch, and another character's life has to be sacrificed for the child's.

Daniel Hall

Daniel Hall is the son of Lyta Hall, and the successor to the role of Dream of the Endless.

Lyta Hall

Hippolyta "Lyta" Hall is a major character, the mother of Daniel. During Dream's captivity, pregnant Lyta and her husband were held captive in a dream-realm controlled by Brute and Glob, two of Dream's minions. In this pocket realm, Lyta remained pregnant for two years, giving birth to her son Daniel only after Dream destroys the pocket realm (and Lyta's husband) and frees her. When Dream tells Lyta that the child she gestated in dreams will one day belong to him, Lyta swears she will protect Daniel at all costs. When Daniel goes missing, Lyta is convinced that Dream has stolen him and seeks revenge, unwittingly setting into motion the events of Dream's death.

John Hathaway
John Hathaway is the senior curator of the Royal Museum. He steals the Magdalene Grimoire from the museum's collection to aid Roderick Burgess in his attempt to gain immortality after his son, Edmund, dies. He commits suicide in 1920 using a dagger from the museum after a stock taking reveals his theft. His suicide note, implicating Roderick Burgess in a multitude of crimes, is never found.

Hazel McNamara
Hazel McNamara is Foxglove's lover. She appears in
A Game of You and Death: The High Cost of Living.

She has a son, Alvie, from her one heterosexual encounter. It is likely that Alvie is named after Wanda (see below).  In Death: The Time of Your Life Alvie dies of cot death and Hazel makes a deal with Death to bring him back.

Unity Kinkaid
Unity Kinkaid first appears as one of the victims of the sleepy sickness that follows Dream's capture in the first collection of issues in the series, Preludes and Nocturnes. Following his capture, she sleeps until he escapes. While asleep, she gives birth to a daughter, Miranda Walker. It is later shown that the father of this child was Desire. Unity is later identified as a "vortex of Dream": a rare entity with the ability to telepathically combine the dreams of other beings, and who can thus cause the destruction of The Dreaming. The only time Dream is allowed to take a human life is to kill a vortex. Desire's intervention transfers the vortex to Unity's granddaughter, Rose Walker, in the hope that Dream will kill one of their relatives, and thus incur the vengeance of the Furies. Before Dream can kill Rose, Unity reclaims the vortex and dies in her stead.

Unity is of medium height, with reddish-brown hair that she wears long and loose, in the final dream-meeting between herself, Rose, and Dream; as the old woman of waking life, she has grey hair and wears a curiously old-fashioned dress.

Prez Rickard

Prez Rickard is a fictional character who first appeared in Prez #1 (December 1973).  He is the subject of the story "The Golden Boy", in Sandman #54, where he is the first 19-year-old to be elected President of the United States.

Ruthven Sykes
Ruthven Sykes is a bespectacled Afro-Caribbean man with short hair.

He is Roderick Burgess' second-in-command of the Order of the Ancient Mysteries until November 1930, when he steals a number of treasures (including Dream's helmet, ruby and pouch of sand) and £200,000 in cash from the order and flees to San Francisco with Roderick's mistress, Ethel Cripps. In December 1930, he trades the helmet to the demon Choronzon for an amulet that looks like an eyeball on a chain. This amulet protects him from the magics of Burgess until 1936, when Ethel Cripps leaves him, taking the amulet with her. He is then killed.

Jed Walker

Jed Walker, created by Joe Simon and Jack Kirby, first appeared in The Sandman, vol. 1, #1, where he was protected from nightmare monsters by the titular hero. In Cancelled Comic Cavalcade #2, he was revealed to be the Earth-1 equivalent of Kirby's Kamandi.  In Neil Gaiman's revisionist version of The Sandman, Jed is the brother of Rose Walker and the grandson of Unity Kinkaid and Desire.  He was raised by his grandfather, Ezra Paulsen, then taken and imprisoned by his abusive aunt and uncle at the behest of Desire. Once Rose rescues him, he is revealed in The Wake to have become close to her.

Rose Walker
Rose Walker is a fictional character from the Sandman series written by Neil Gaiman. She makes her first appearance in issue #10, part one of The Doll's House story arc. She is a young blonde with red- and purple-dyed streaks in her hair. In later issues, she is shown as having red hair with a blonde streak. In The Kindly Ones, several characters remark that Rose looks much younger than her actual age; Rose's responses to these comments imply that while she may not be a true immortal, she is aware that she is aging more slowly than normal. She is the granddaughter of Desire.

Clarice and Barnaby
Clarice and Barnaby, aunt and uncle of Jed and Rose, were introduced in The Sandman vol. 1, #5, created by Michael Fleisher and Jack Kirby.  The pair mysteriously show up on Dolphin Island a few hours after the drowning death of Jed's grandfather, fisherman Ezra Paulsen.  They take him to live with their own children, Bruce and Susie.  They treat him as a personal slave not unlike Cinderella, with minimal food even as he does all the cooking.  Eventually, their treatment of him is revealed to have become much more abusive—after he runs away from home, they place him in a basement dungeon with no toilet.  This is told in issues 5 and 6 of the first series, The Best of DC #22, and recapped in Rose's diary in issue #11 of the Gaiman series.  In issue #12, their mysterious appearance is revealed to have been because they were being paid an $800 monthly stipend by social services.  In issue #14, they are revealed to have been killed.

Wanda
Wanda: A transgender woman featured in A Game of You who is Barbie's best friend. She dies in a storm caused by Thessaly's magic and is buried as 'Alvin Mann', her deadname. In response, Barbie uses lipstick to write Wanda's name on her gravestone. Wanda is last seen, along with Death, in Barbie's dream.

Historical figures
 Haroun al-Raschid: King of Baghdad, who sells the city to Dream to keep it alive forever, in the One Thousand and One Arabian Nights.
 Caesar Augustus: The first emperor of Rome. In The Sandman he is revealed to carry psychological scars from being continually raped by his uncle, Julius Caesar, which he (at Dream's advice) assuages by planning the destruction of Caesar's empire.
 Lycius: A dwarf, born of the Roman nobility, who lived in the time of Caesar Augustus. Augustus had banned the nobility from working as actors upon the stage, but he made an exception for Lycius, who had few other opportunities.
 Joshua A. Norton: An English-American declaring himself 'Emperor of the United States' in "Three Septembers and a January", after Dream gives him his delusion as part of a challenge issued by his three younger siblings: Despair, who tries to make him fall into her realm by making his life increasingly difficult; Delirium, who makes a half-attempt to drive him insane; and Desire, who uses the King of Pain to tempt him with a real palace and a Queen. In the end, Joshua Norton lives a happy and dignified life; and when he dies, thousands come to see him off.
 The King of Pain: According to Herbert Asbury's book The Barbary Coast: An Informal History of the San Francisco Underworld, an itinerant healer in 19th century San Francisco who sold aconite liniment. In The Sandman #31 ("Three Septembers and a January", reprinted in Fables and Reflections), the King of Pain is Desire's undead minion. He tries to tempt Emperor Norton into betraying his dignity for his desires (in the form of Worldly Power, Wealth, An Estate, and A Noble Wife). Norton retains his dignity and refuses the offers, saying that he is content ruling his city and that he has all he needs.
 Mark Twain: American writer who shares his story about a jumping frog with Emperor Norton.
 Thomas Paine: English radical who, after participating in the French Revolution, is imprisoned in the Luxembourg Palace and briefly encounters Johanna Constantine.
 Louis de Saint-Just: Orator of the French Revolution and supporter of the Terror, he is deposed after Orpheus sings a song that saps his ability to articulate.
 Maximilien Robespierre: Leader of the Committee of Public Safety and instigator of the Reign of Terror. An extreme dreamer, he seeks to destroy the head of Orpheus due to his wish to destroy all myths, but is in turn destroyed by it.
 Marco Polo: The famous 13th-century explorer and trader. He is lost in a part of the Dreaming that connects to the real world, and encounters Rusticello, a friend of his future self; Fiddler's Green; and Dream, who gives an otherwise forbidden passage home. Upon waking Marco is unable to remember any of his encounters.
 Rustichello da Pisa: The publisher of Marco's autobiography, who encounters his friend in a dream in the Desert of Lop.
 William Shakespeare: The famous 16/17th-century English playwright. Dream gives him the inspiration for many of his plays in exchange for Shakespeare writing two plays for him: A Midsummer Night's Dream and The Tempest.
 Hamnet Shakespeare: The son of William, he is often overlooked by his father. It is implied that Titania may have taken him into the realm of Faerie (this is confirmed in a brief cameo in The Books of Magic).
 Christopher Marlowe: A famous 16th-century playwright who is depicted discussing Shakespeare's terrible writing and Marlowe's Faust. Shakespeare tells Marlowe, "God's wounds! If only I could write like you!"
 Geoffrey Chaucer: The famous 14th-century poet and author of The Canterbury Tales is seen in the White Horse Tavern in AD 1389 in part four of The Doll's House, where Dream first meets Hob Gadling. It is mentioned in the tavern that people do not want "filthy tales in rhyme about pilgrims", a reference to The Canterbury Tales.
 Anne Hathaway: The wife of William Shakespeare.
 Susanna Shakespeare: Older daughter of William and Anne Shakespeare.
 Judith Shakespeare: Younger daughter of William and Anne Shakespeare.
 Thomas Quiney: Pub waiter and future husband of Judith.
 Ben Jonson: Poet and friend of William Shakespeare.

Minor mortals
 Barbie: Introduced as one of Rose Walker's housemates in The Doll's House, later the protagonist of A Game of You.
 Daniel Bustamonte: A victim of the 'sleepy sickness' that results from Dream's capture. He falls asleep in 1926, then wakes up sometime before 1955, staying awake much of the time but unable to speak. He recovers fully on September 14, 1988, when Dream escapes.
 Chantal and Zelda: Apparently lesbian roommates in the house Rose Walker was staying at in The Doll's House. They dress in white and collect dead spiders. Of the two, Zelda relies on Chantal for confidence, and rarely if ever speaks. When they dream, Zelda dreams of her childhood, where it is implied that she collected bones. Chantal's dreams are self-repeating loops, trying to explain something of nothing. In a later issue Zelda is dying from AIDS which she contracted from Chantal, who has already died, having originally contracted it from an organ transplant. They are identified with Euryale and Stheno, the sisters of Medusa.
 Compton: Roderick Burgess' butler.
 Nurse Edmund: Alex Burgess' caretaker at the time he is put under Dream's curse.
 Ernie and Frederick: Two of the men guarding Dream when he escapes from his imprisonment.
 Doctor "Piggy" Huntoon: a doctor in Arkham Asylum and former schoolmate of Constantine's. He used to perform electroshock therapy on Constantine, back when he was institutionalized.
 Richard Madoc: An author, director and playwright who imprisoned and repeatedly raped Dream's ex-lover Calliope. Dream punishes Madoc with an overwhelming flood of ideas; whereupon he destroys his fingers trying to record them in his own blood. In The Wake he is seen attending Morpheus' funeral whilst dreaming, and it is implied that after Morpheus' death, Madoc's mind is slowly healing.
 Ellie Marsten: A victim of the 'sleepy sickness' that occurs during Dream's capture. She sleeps continuously for decades, awaking only four or five times a year, and recovers in an insane asylum on September 14, 1988, when Morpheus escapes. Her waking memory is basically founded on the book Through the Looking-Glass by Lewis Carroll.
 Paul McGuire: Good friend and lover of Alex Burgess. Originally a gardener at the estate, Paul eventually takes over the Order of Ancient Mysteries.
 Rachel: An ex-girlfriend of Constantine's who stole Dream's pouch of sand from Constantine and became addicted to its effects.
 Stefan Wasserman: A victim of the 'sleepy sickness' that results from Dream's capture. Joins the army during the First World War at 14, and goes over the trenches shortly before he catches the sickness. Commits suicide in 1918 at age 16 because he cannot sleep. He was inhabited by the dormant spirit of the Corinthian.
 The Scarecrow (Dr. Jonathan Crane): The Arkham inmate attempts to dissuade his friend Doctor Destiny from escaping, saying Arkham is a better home for their kind than the outside world. He is portrayed as a nervous, paranoid, babbling academic, trying to make jokes to psychologically test his prison guards, and unable to sleep for fear of rats.
 Judy, a young lesbian who is one of the victims of John Dee using Dream's ruby in Preludes and Nocturnes. At the time of her forced suicide, she was trying to reconcile with her girlfriend Donna (Foxglove). In The Doll's House, she was revealed to be the best friend of Rose Walker.
 Nada: A beautiful African queen, cast into hell by the Dream King (known to her as Kai'ckul) when she refuses to become his queen. Her story is revealed in the beginning of The Doll's House. An argument over her unfair punishment prompts Dream's initial actions in Seasons of Mist, and eventually Dream begs her forgiveness and lets her choose her own fate. Nada chooses to be reincarnated as a baby boy in Hong Kong.

Superheroes
 Mister Miracle (Scott Free) informs Dream that his ruby is no longer kept at Justice League headquarters. (#7, Preludes and Nocturnes)
 Martian Manhunter (J'onn J'onnz), last member of the original Justice League lineup, gives Dream the details of the storage unit where the JLA's old trophies, including the ruby, are kept. (#7, Preludes and Nocturnes). Also makes an appearance alongside Batman, as does Clark Kent, in issue #71 (The Wake). Darkseid is also seen at the wake.
 The Sandman (Hector Hall): The dead father of Daniel Hall and successor to Garrett Sanford, whose death is noted. Hall's only previous appearances as The Sandman were in Infinity Inc. #49–51. (#11–12, The Doll's House)
 Element Girl (Urania Blackwell): Death, coming for an upstairs neighbour who has fallen off a ladder, visits her, sensing her longing to die, but is unable to take her, though she informs her that Ra (the sun) can take her power back so she can die. (#20, Dream Country)

Other

Barnabas
Barnabas is a sarcastic talking dog who belonged to Destruction and was assigned to guard Delirium. His origins are unknown.

Basanos
The Basanos was a living Tarot deck created by the seraph Meleos to duplicate the divining power of Destiny's book.  They are incredibly powerful due to the fact that they control probability, making whatever outcome they desire not only likely, but inevitable.

After escaping from Meleos, the Basanos took possession of Jill Presto, a cabaret worker. Lucifer Morningstar sought them out for a tarot reading, which they granted.

When Lucifer created his new universe, the Basanos moved to take control of it so that they could breed (something that is impossible in God's cosmos).  Though initially successful in their plan, forming an alliance with Lucifer's enemies, their ability to control randomness was severely limited by Lucifer's creation, and Lucifer was able to outmaneuver them.  Lucifer finally gave them an ultimatum:  destroy themselves or risk letting the egg they laid in Jill Presto die.  The Basanos chose death and extinguished themselves.

Basanos is Greek for touchstone. Such a touchstone may be a piece of slate used to test gold, or it may be a metaphor for torture or torment to test truthfulness. Why Meleos chose this name for his creation is unknown.

Charles Rowland and Edwin Paine
Charles Rowland was the only boy left at his boarding school during the holidays when Lucifer closed Hell, sending its former inhabitants back to Earth. While the adults of the school are preoccupied with the dead spirits who came back into their own lives, Charles is tortured and killed by three dead boys who used to go to the same school. Edwin Paine is a previous victim of the trio, his body still trapped on the grounds. He befriends Charles, but is unable to keep him from dying. When Death shows up, Charles refuses to go with her, and she lets him go, preferring to focus on all the other trouble Hell's closure has brought her. They later appeared in other books as the Dead Boy Detectives.

Eblis O'Shaughnessy
Eblis O'Shaughnessy: a golem and envoy created by the Endless to obtain the Cerements and the "Book of Ritual" for the funeral rites of their brother Dream. Five of the Endless participated in the creation of Eblis O'Shaughnessy, and Delirium named him. He thereafter accompanied them at the funeral. He reappears in the Vertigo story The Girl Who Would Be Death (1999).

Alianora
Alianora was first introduced in A Game of You as the original inhabitant of The Land, a region of the dreaming that Barbie has visited since childhood and is being threatened by the Cuckoo. After the Hierogram is broken and The Land is dissolved, Alianora appears and speaks to Dream. Her history is expanded in The Sandman: Overture, where it is revealed that she was created by Desire to be Dream's lover and to help him escape imprisonment after the Dreaming is invaded by two unspecified gods. Together, they vanquish the Gods, but Dream is unable to make her happy so he creates The Land as a place in which she can be free and contented.

References

External links

Characters
Sandman, The
Vertigo Comics characters